The Gifted Education Research Resource Institute (GERI) is a multidimensional center dedicated to the study, discovery, and development of human potential. It was founded by John F. Feldhusen in 1977 and is situated in the College of Education, Purdue University in West Lafayette, Indiana. GERI's mission is holistic development of giftedness, creativity, and talent among individuals throughout their lifespan. This is accomplished through enrichment programs for talented youth, graduate programs for future scholars and leaders, professional development and coursework for educators, and ongoing research on the psychology of giftedness, creativity, and talent development.
GERI faculty and staff work with P-12  educators in developing and improving services for gifted, creative, and talented children, as well as training school teachers and administrators in gifted education. In addition, GERI has developed several programs for talented youth. The Super Saturday program, a six-week enrichment program, was created in the spring of 1976. In 1977, GERI began Summer Residential Camps, aimed at providing a preview of college life to talented students.



Talent development programs 

The talent development programs at GERI help talented students explore their areas of interest in a college atmosphere where they study topics typically not offered in school. Together, students learn challenging content and create meaningful projects in which they apply their learning in new and relevant ways. Participation in GERI programs provides students in-depth and clear understanding of the fields they might like to pursue.  Many students attend GERI Talent Development Programs for multiple years.

Summer residential camps 

Every summer, for over 34 years, GERI has engaged gifted, creative, and talented students from across the country and around the world in residential camps designed to stimulate their imagination and expand their abilities.  Students who have completed grades 5 through 12 live in campus residence halls, take challenging courses, and participate in engaging recreational activities. 
GERI offers three programs each summer. 
 Comet, 1 week sessions:  For students who have completed grade 5–6.
 Star, 2 week sessions:  For students who have completed grades 7–8.
 Pulsar, 2 week sessions: For students who have completed grades 9-12.
The application process includes:
 Completing the application form.
 Creating a one-to two-page essay or alternative media (such as a Web site, PowerPoint presentation, or art portfolio) that addresses the applicant's desire and motivation to participate.
 Submitting evidence of notable ability, achievement, or involvement in the areas of study as detailed in the program brochure.  Such evidence can include grades, test scores, letters of recommendation, and awards.

Super Summer and Super Saturday programs 
The Super Summer and Super Saturday programs are two enrichment programs designed to meet the needs of academically, creatively, and artistically gifted students from Pre-Kindergarten (age 4) through grade 8. The courses include science, technology, engineering, mathematics, visual and performing arts, as well as original interdisciplinary studies.  Super Saturday is offered both fall and spring semesters for six Saturdays, and Super Summer is offered week days during the summer for two, one-week sessions. 
Research on these programs found that students had positive experiences, learned new, above-grade-level concepts, and participated in interactive learning.

Graduate programs

Ph.D. and master's 

The internationally recognized Ph.D. and master's degree programs in gifted, creative, and talented studies attract students from across the country and around the world. Working closely with faculty scholars as mentors, students prepare for productive leadership roles in research, teaching, and program development. Funding may be available to support exceptional students pursuing full-time Ph.D. study.

Licensure 

The accredited licensure program is available online and on campus for teachers interested in adding a high-ability license to their Indiana teaching credentials or as a certificate in gifted, creative, and talented studies for educators in other states and countries. In this program, educators develop the knowledge and skills to meet the cognitive, affective, and social needs of gifted, creative and talented learners. They learn to how to develop and differentiate curriculum and instruction; and they prepare for leadership and teaching roles in working with and developing programs for gifted, creative, and talented students

Research 

The faculty and graduate students at GERI engage in cutting-edge research that informs and influences theory and practice. Some examples include: 
 Total School Cluster Grouping Model
 Purdue Three-Stage Model
 Theory of Personal Talent
 Developing talent in the STEM disciplines
 Applying gifted education know-how to improve general education
 Understanding social and affective needs
 Investigating students’ perceptions of their learning experiences
 Studying twice-exceptional learners
 Recognizing and developing talent among underserved populations and in non-traditional areas

Professional development 

Faculty and staff conduct professional development related to their research using online, on-site, and campus-based delivery methods, engaging educators from across the United States and from schools worldwide.

References

External links
 GERI official website, Purdue University
 Jack Kent Cooke Foundation
 National Association for Gifted Children

Gifted education
Alternative education
Summer camps in Indiana
Middle States Commission on Secondary Schools